was a Japanese lawyer and politician from the Japanese Communist Party, he served for a total of 10 terms in the House of Representatives from 1969 to 2000, representing Osaka's 2nd District.

References

1924 births
2014 deaths
People from Nara, Nara
20th-century Japanese lawyers
Members of the House of Representatives (Japan)
Japanese Communist Party politicians
Deaths from cancer in Japan